Irving Joshua Matrix — previously known as Irving Joshua Bush and commonly known as Dr. (I. J.) Matrix — is a fictitious polymath scientist, scholar, cowboy, and entrepreneur who made extraordinary contributions to perpetual motion engineering, Biblical cryptography and numerology, pyramid power, pentagonal meditation, extra-sensory perception, psychic metallurgy, and a number of other topics.  He is an accomplished prestidigitator and a mathematician. Being a fictitious character he could perform tasks that were logically impossible; for example, he could "clap one hand in the air" when summoning a waiter or a minion.
 
Dr. Matrix was the satirical creation of Scientific American columnist Martin Gardner (1914–2010) who introduced him in his "Mathematical Games" column in January 1960.  The mythical doctor appeared frequently thereafter and the relevant columns were eventually collected into a book.  The intent was partly to provide colorful context to mathematical puzzles and curiosities, partly to spoof various pseudo-scientific theories, and to provide a humorous introduction to the serious topic at hand.

Fictitious biography
Matrix was born in Japan, the eldest of  seven children of the Reverend William Miller Bush, a Seventh-day Adventist missionary.  He resided in Japan until the end of World War II, where he learned the secrets of the conjuring art and worked as assistant to the famous Japanese magician Tenkai.

Presumably it was in Japan that he met Ms. Eisei Toshiyori, and where their daughter Iva Matrix was born on December 31, 1939. Iva accompanied Dr. Matrix through most of his public life, acting as assistant and manager in most of his enterprises.  The author of the fictitious narrative pretended to be romantically interested in Iva, thus explaining his continuing interest in Dr. Matrix's activities.

He was a close friend and a student of Nicolas Bourbaki.

Martin Gardner tells of meeting the shady Dr. Matrix at Pyramid Lake, Nevada.  He was accompanied by a Filipino assistant named Rhee, who was missing most of his teeth.  They called him "One-Tooth Rhee."  Both were chased out of town for running a pyramid scheme.

Dr. Matrix was often persecuted by establishment authorities, and many times had to change abode and live under assumed names, with appropriate matching changed appearances. He was accused several times of fraud. He reportedly died in 1980, in a duel against a certain Ivan Skavinsky Skavar, a KGB agent, in circumstances as obscure and dubious as most of his career.

However, in 1987 Gardner encountered Matrix, alive and well, in Casablanca at "Rick's Café Américain" of all places.  It was explained that Ivan's bullet merely grazed him, but in order to avoid retaliation by the KGB, witnesses were bribed to state that he died, and a fake funeral was arranged.

Dr. Matrix columns
Martin Gardner chronicled the story of Dr. Matrix in the following Mathematical Games columns.

Legacy
A web site, Ask Dr. Matrix exists which finds a numerological link between two user chosen numbers. Irish mathematical enthusiast and author Owen O’Shea has been dubbed by the New York Times as "the heir apparent to Dr. I. J. Matrix in numerological acumen”.

Bibliography
Gardner's Dr. Matrix book went through three editions.    The complete list is:
 The Numerology of Dr. Matrix: The Fabulous Feats and Adventures in Number Theory, Sleight of Word, and Numerological Analysis (Literary, Biblical, Political, Philosophical and Psychonumeranalytical) of That Incredible Master Mind (1967), Simon & Schuster.
 Reprinted/expanded as The Incredible Dr. Matrix: The World's Greatest Numerologist'''' (1976), Charles Scribner's Sons; .
 Reprinted/expanded as The Magic Numbers of Dr. Matrix (1985); Prometheus Books; Library of Congress Catalog Card No. 84-43183,  (cloth), 0-87975-282-3 (paper).  
All of the Dr. Matrix columns from 1960 to 1980 are collected in the third, and final, edition.  One final story about Dr. Matrix appears in Gardner's book:
 Penrose Tiles to Trapdoor Ciphers: –and the Return of Dr Matrix'', Mathematical Association of America, Washington, DC, 1997

References

External links
 Ask Dr. Matrix An on-line cybernetic numerologist inspired by Dr. Matrix

Matrix, Irving Joshua
Fictional cowboys and cowgirls
Fictional engineers
Matrix, Irving Joshua
Fictional parapsychologists
Fictional scholars
Fictional stage magicians